Chikee or Chickee ("house" in the Creek and Mikasuki languages spoken by the Seminoles and Miccosukees) is a shelter supported by posts, with a raised floor, a thatched roof and open sides. Chickees are also known as chickee huts, stilt houses, or platform dwellings.
The chickee style of architecture—palmetto thatch over a bald cypress log frame—was adopted by Seminoles during the Second (1835–42) and Third (1855-58) Seminole Wars as U.S. troops pushed them deeper into the Everglades and surrounding territory. Before the Second Seminole War, the Seminoles had lived in log cabins. Similar structures were used by the tribes in south Florida when the Spanish first arrived in the 16th century. Each chickee had its own purpose and together they were organized within a camp-type community. Chickees were used for cooking, sleeping, and eating.

Modern use
Chickees continue to be used by Native American villages of the Miccosukee in the Everglades. Some upscale homes in southern Florida feature chickee-inspired buildings as garden or poolside structures. A few restaurants in Florida still use this indigenous design to attract visitors.

Chickees are also used in backcountry areas of Everglades National Park including along the Everglades Wilderness Waterway where mangroves or wetlands prevent camping on dry land.  Made and maintained primarily for backcountry campers, these wooden structures stand several feet above the water and can usually accommodate four to five campers. These structures have portable restrooms. Some "double chickees" are linked by a walkway and can accommodate eight to ten people. 
There are about eight to ten chickees in one village. Chickees are very helpful, especially in the rain. Similar structures, while not referred to as chickees, are present further north, in the Okefenokee National Wildlife Refuge in southern Georgia.

See also
Palapa – a structure with thatched roof and open sides in Mexico

Notes

Huts
Pavilions
Stilt houses
Thatched buildings
Seminole culture
Traditional Native American dwellings
Native American history of Florida
Everglades